Nintendo Direct is a series of online presentation or live shows produced by Nintendo, where information regarding the company's upcoming content or franchises is presented, such as information about games and consoles. The presentations began in Japan and North America with the first edition on October 21, 2011, before later expanding to Europe, Australia, and South Korea.

Format 
Nintendo Direct presentations vary in format between different presentations and regions.

Regional differences 
Nintendo Directs generally come in both regional and international formats.

International 
For subjects of a general worldwide appeal, a single Nintendo Direct is often localized for a simultaneous international broadcast. Usually, these will be recorded in Japanese and presented by a Japanese presenter. Prior to Nintendo president Satoru Iwata's death, he would host Directs in both English and Japanese, with other languages' presentations being subtitled.

Upon Iwata's death, Nintendo Directs did not receive a worldwide host until 2017, when Yoshiaki Koizumi from Nintendo EPD took over this role. Since 2018, Koizumi has shared this responsibility with Shinya Takahashi. E3 Directs sometimes featured Reggie Fils-Aime as a host for a short period of time until his departure in 2019.

Since 2017, the Japanese presenter and any narrators' roles will be dubbed or subtitled for international release, including into English.

Presentations scheduled for around the time of the Electronic Entertainment Expo were originally produced by Nintendo of America, presented in English and dubbed or subtitled into other languages for international broadcast. Since 2019, E3 directs are produced by Nintendo of Japan, presented in Japanese and dubbed or subtitled into other languages for international broadcast.

Japan 
In Japan, Nintendo Directs were most commonly presented by Nintendo's global president Satoru Iwata until his death in 2015. Yoshiaki Koizumi started serving as host in 2017. Shinya Takahashi started sharing the hosting duties with Koizumi in 2018.

Since 2017, Japan has hosted region-specific "Indie World" presentations, focusing on indie games published for Nintendo Switch.

Directs focused on Super Smash Bros. are typically hosted by series creator and director Masahiro Sakurai.

North America 
In North America, the videos were often presented by Nintendo of America president, Reggie Fils-Aimé (before he retired in 2019), and Bill Trinen.

For international Directs produced in Japan since 2017, Nintendo of America would air a dubbed version of the Direct in English; although a notable exception of having it subtitled instead of dubbed were the Mr. Sakurai Presents presentations starting with "Min Min" from ARMS in 2020 and up until the final presentation with "Sora" from Kingdom Hearts in 2021 due to the COVID-19 pandemic making it difficult to record the voice-overs. Both the presenter and narrator are dubbed by separate narrators.

Since 2017, Nintendo of America has aired presentations focusing on indie games published for Nintendo Switch. Between 2017 and 2019, these were branded as "Nindies Showcase", before aligning their branding to the Japanese "Indie World" banner. These presentations were usually hosted by Bill Trinen.

Europe and Australia 
European Directs were presented by former Nintendo of Europe president, Satoru Shibata and Ed Valiente. These presentations were also broadcast in Australia.

Australia generally only airs the European output, but one Direct was created specifically for the region, broadcast on September 24, 2014. This Direct was hosted by Tom Enoki.

For international Directs produced in Japan since 2017, Nintendo of Europe and Nintendo Australia airs the original Japanese audio for the presenters, but uses an English dub for the narrated sections. These are then subtitled for broadcast in other languages. Since 2019, the "Pokémon Direct"/"Pokémon Presents" are the only Directs that are dubbed for Europe and Australia in English, however, they are subtitled in different languages with the English dub.

Since 2017, Nintendo of Europe has broadcast presentations focusing on indie games published for Nintendo Switch. From 2017 to 2018, Nintendo of Europe broadcast the American "Nindies Showcase" presentations. In 2018 and 2019, Nintendo of Europe hosted its own "Indie Highlights" videos. Since 2019, they returned to broadcasting Nintendo of America's presentations, now under the "Indie World" banner, with Nintendo Australia broadcasting later on.

South Korea 
South Korea has also aired exclusive Nintendo Directs hosted by Nintendo of Korea president, Hiroyuki Fukuda.

Hong Kong and Taiwan 
A few Nintendo Direct presentations have been produced specifically for Hong Kong and Taiwan.

Types of Nintendo Direct presentations 
Outside of the general Nintendo Direct presentations, which cover a range of titles, there are also Directs centred around specific titles or series. These are usually presented by the producer or director of the game or series, or employ a narrator.

Nintendo E3 Directs 
Since June 2013, in lieu of traditional large-scale Electronic Entertainment Expo (E3) press conferences, Nintendo has opted to utilize the Nintendo Direct platform as an alternative method of conveying its news. Speaking at an annual March financial results briefing just two months prior, Nintendo CEO Satoru Iwata stated that the company's decision was determined by the fact that “different people demand different types of information”, and that the Nintendo Direct platform had established itself to the point that Nintendo would “be able to deliver [their] messages more appropriately and effectively … based on the various needs of different groups of people”. Christopher Dring of GamesIndustry.biz observed that the last press conference that Nintendo held at E3 in 2012 featured too much of a mix between Nintendo's new hardware for the Wii U and game announcements. Compared to other press conferences held that year, Nintendo's presentation left little for fans of the company to be excited for. By switching to Nintendo Directs, Dring opined that the company was able to better connect to fans using the Nintendo Direct presentations, made the faces of Nintendo's executives more visible, as well as having Directs outside of the E3 cycle to provide more frequent updates on game and hardware releases.

During the stream of the pre-recorded broadcast for E3 2013, Nintendo's website suffered from technical difficulties in the form of overloaded servers, rendering the live video unwatchable for many viewers, and prompting an official apology from Satoru Iwata. Despite these difficulties, Nintendo of America President Reggie Fils-Aimé noted that secondary viewership following the initial broadcast still worked to popularize product promotion.

The following year, in addition to the Direct, the company added "Nintendo Treehouse: Live @ E3" live streams to their presence at the trade event. Named after the Product Development department at Nintendo of America, these are daily streams from the show floor that feature NoA localization staff and game developers demoing and giving in-depth coverage of titles that were announced during that year's Direct. The year also began a trend of Nintendo hosting a game tournament sometime during the week, in which the participants compete in titles that had yet to be released.

The last time that Nintendo held a Nintendo Direct for E3 was during the 2021 event as IGN reported that Nintendo would not be part of E3 starting with the 2023 event. Nintendo confirmed this report a month later, citing that "this year’s E3 show didn’t fit into our plans."

List of presentations 
Alongside Nintendo Direct presentations, other Nintendo-produced online presentations without "Direct" in its name are listed.

See also 
 List of Iwata Asks interviews

Notes

References

External links 
 Official North American website 
 Official European website 
 Official Australian website 
 Official Korean website
 Official Japanese website 

Direct
Direct
YouTube channels launched in 2011
Recurring events established in 2011
2011 web series debuts
Direct